Murman Dumbadze  (born January 1, 1960) is a Georgian politician. He was member of the 8th term of parliament of Georgia (2012–2016). He was a member of GD. In 2016 he founded and is leader of the party named Serve Georgia. He is a specialist in Mathematics. He studied at Tbilisi State University.

He was:

 The member of Adjara Supreme Council (2004 - 2008)

 The member of Adjara Temporary Presidential Board (2004)

 Docent, Adjara State University (1991 - 2008)

 Engineer-programmer, Adjara Hydro-meteorological Centre (1990 - 1991)

 Post-graduate of Management Problem Institute (1987 - 1990)

 Scientific-Research Institute Mioni (1982 - 1986)

Personal life 
He has wife named Ketevan Surmanidze and two sons, Mukhrani and Rusudani.

References 
Parliament of Georgia
Biographical dictionary of Georgia

1960 births
Living people
People from Khelvachauri
Politicians from Georgia (country)
Tbilisi State University alumni